St Joseph's GAA is a Gaelic Athletic Association Gaelic football club in County Laois, Ireland. It won nine Laois Senior Football Championship titles between 1973 and 2000. The club colours are yellow with blue trim and the main club grounds are located at Kellyville with a secondary grounds at Milltown.

History
Founded in 1954 as an underage club, it won the Laois minor and junior football titles in 1967, the minor title again in 1968, the Laois Intermediate Football Championship in 1969 and a further junior title in 1976.

Then St Joseph's progressed to win nine Laois Senior Football Championship titles: in 1973, 1975, 1977, 1978, 1983, 1989, 1994, 1996 and 2000.

As well as this, the club (in an amalgamation with Barrowhouse) won the Under-21 Championship in 2008, 2011, 2015 and 2016. It is a parish team and is made up of the four small areas represented on the club crest: Ballyadams, Luggacurren, The Swan and Wolfhill.

Players (past and present) include Tom Kelly, Joe Higgins, Martin Dempsey, Kieran Brennan, Dessie Brennan, Mick Dempsey and Seán Dempsey.

Notable players
 Mick Dempsey
 Seán Dempsey
 Noel Garvan
 Joe Higgins
 Tom Kelly, All Star (2003) and International Rules Series Player of the Series (2005)

Honours
 Laois Senior Football Championships: (9) 1973, 1975, 1977, 1978, 1983, 1989, 1994, 1996, 2000
 Laois All-County Football Leagues: (7) 1971, 1987, 1991, 1993, 1995, 2001, 2010
 Laois All-County Football League Division 3: 2005, 2010
 Laois Intermediate Football Championship 1969
 Laois Junior Football Championships 1967, 1976, 2017
 Laois Under-21 Football Championship (4) (With Barrowhouse) 2008, 2011, 2015, 2016
 Laois Minor Football Championship (2) 1967, 1968

References

External links
 Laoistalk - Laois GAA News Website
 Official Website

Gaelic games clubs in County Laois